think-cell is a German computer software company founded in April 2002 and headquartered in Berlin, Germany.  The Fraunhofer Society spin-off focuses upon the creation of Microsoft PowerPoint and Excel add-in products.

The company's main product – think-cell – aims to facilitate the creation of charts, e.g., bar charts, waterfall charts, Marimekko charts and Gantt charts, on Microsoft PowerPoint presentation slides from Microsoft Excel data sheets. Some features overlap with those provided by newer versions of Microsoft Office, such as waterfall charts that are built-in charts in Office 2016.

Based on a revenue growth rate of 3,150% over five years think-cell took 4th place in Deloitte Germany's 2009 Technology Fast 50 Awards.

The most recent version – think-cell 11 – was launched in December 2020.

References

External links 
 Indezine Interview with Managing Director Markus Hannebauer
 Bloomberg Businessweek Article on Corporate Berlin

Companies established in 2002
Software companies of Germany
2002 establishments in Germany